The 1995–96 George Mason Patriots Men's basketball team represented George Mason University during the 1995–96 NCAA Division I men's basketball season. This was the 30th season for the program, the third under head coach Paul Westhead. The Patriots played their home games at the Patriot Center in Fairfax, Virginia.

Honors and awards 

Colonial Athletic Association All-Conference Team
 Curtis McCants

Player statistics

Schedule and results

|-
!colspan=12 style=| Non-conference regular season

|-
!colspan=12 style=|CAA regular season

|-
!colspan=12 style=|1996 CAA tournament

References

George Mason Patriots men's basketball seasons
George Mason
George Mason men's basketball
George Mason men's basketball